Iurii Tsaruk (born 2 May 1987) is a Ukrainian athlete who competes in disability athletics in the T35 category. He won the gold medal for the 200 metres at the 2012 Paralympic Games for his category with a new World Record. Tsaruk set a European record to win the 100 metres at London 2012. Tsaruk won the silver medal in the 100 and 200 metres at the 2013 World Championships. In 2012 he also won a bronze medal for the 100 metres at the European Championships.

References

External links
 London 2012 200 metres final video
 

1987 births
Living people
Paralympic athletes of Ukraine
Paralympic gold medalists for Ukraine
Athletes (track and field) at the 2012 Summer Paralympics
Medalists at the 2012 Summer Paralympics
World record holders in Paralympic athletics
Medalists at the World Para Athletics Championships
Medalists at the World Para Athletics European Championships
Paralympic medalists in athletics (track and field)